Michal Hlavatý (born 17 June 1998) is a professional Czech football midfielder currently playing for FK Pardubice.

Club career 
He made his senior league debut for Sokolov on 30 July 2017 in a Czech National Football League 2–1 loss at Vlašim.

International career 
He represented the Czech Republic in multiple youth categories. He participated in the 2017–18 U20 Elite League, scoring a goal in Czech Republic's 3–0 victory against Portugal.

References

External links
 
 Michal Hlavatý official international statistics
 
 Michal Hlavatý profile on the FC Viktoria Plzeň official website
 Michal Hlavatý at Footballdatabase

Czech footballers
Czech Republic youth international footballers
1998 births
Living people
FC Viktoria Plzeň players
FK Baník Sokolov players
FK Pardubice players
Czech National Football League players
Association football midfielders
People from Hořovice
Sportspeople from the Central Bohemian Region